Helen McClelland may refer to:
Helen Grace McClelland (1887–1984), American army nurse
 Margaret Moncrieff (1921–2008), Scottish writer using pseudonym "Helen McClelland"